Jeton Anjain (25 March 1933 – 1993) was a Minister of Health and a senator of the Marshall Islands Parliament. He received the Goldman Environmental Prize in 1992, for his efforts to help people from the Rongelap Atoll, which was subject to nuclear contamination after the test of the Castle Bravo hydrogen bomb in 1954. In 1991, he and the Rongelap People were awarded the Right Livelihood Award for "their steadfast struggle against United States nuclear policy in support of their right to live on an unpolluted Rongelap island."

Career 
Jeton Anjain was training as a dentist. He was appointed a health minister but he resigned in order to work for Rongelap community and seek assistance in evacuating the island as well as justice for the islanders as a senator to the Marshall Islands Parliament.

Rongelap Atoll Rescue 
Jeton Anjain carried out the evacuation of Rongelap in 1985 to the island Mejato with the help of Greenpeace.

The people of Rongelap, a community of about 250, were afflicted with medical conditions and diseases such as growth retardation, thyroid tumours, cancer and unformed fetuses because of radiation exposure.

After the hydrogen bomb testing in 1954 by the US  in the South Pacific, Rongelap people left the island for 3 years as they were assured by American authorities (1956) that it was safe to settle again in the area because they would not be exposed to radiation anymore. Anjain died in 1993 because of cancer which was probably the result of radiation exposure.

In fact, the islanders were exposed to highly radioactive fallout particles because of the wind blowing in the direction of the Marshall Island's Rongelap Atoll on the day of the tests. According  to a study carried out by the U.S. Department of Energy in 1982, the level of contamination of the soil, water and food was higher than in Bikini Atoll in the South Pacific the site where the hydrogen bom testing took place. Inhabitants of the Bikini Islands had been evacuated from the area while it was not until 1985 that people of Rongelap were removed from the island  due to efforts  and commitment extended by Jeton Anjain.

Anjain was very persistent to convince the American government to evacuate the Rongelap community as well as to make the US  claim the responsibility for the radiation danger on the island. He lobbied the United States Congress for independent radiation tests as well as involved foreign scientists to give scientific evidence for the inhabitants of the island. Because Anjain kept the issue alive islanders were evacuated from the Rongelap and the US government agreed to carry on health and radiation survey in 1991.

Awards 
Anjain received Goldman  Environmental Prize in 1992 as well as was granted Right Livelihood Award (1991) owing to his commitment and involvement into bringing help and justice to people from Rongelap. The Right Livelihood Award Foundation granted the award to Anjain “...for (his) steadfast struggle against United States nuclear policy in support of their right to live on an unpolluted Rongelap island."

References 

1993 deaths
Oceanian environmentalists
Members of the Legislature of the Marshall Islands
Government ministers of the Marshall Islands
1933 births
Goldman Environmental Prize awardees